Sripur may refer to:

 Sripur, Sylhet Division, Bangladesh
 Sripur, Mahottari, Nepal
 Sripur, Seti, Nepal
 Sripur, Jaynagar
 Srīpur (crater), impact crater on Mars
 Sripur Area, operational area in Eastern Coalfields Limited in West Bengal, India
 Sripur, Hooghly, census town, West Bengal, India

See also
 Sirpur, Mahasamund, referred to in archaeological inscriptions and texts as Sripur or Sripura
 Shreepur (disambiguation)